Aldershot Town Football Club is a professional association football club based in Aldershot, Hampshire, England. The team competes in the National League, the fifth tier of the English football league system. The club was founded in the spring of 1992 after the closure of debt-ridden Fourth Division club Aldershot. Aldershot Town play at the Recreation Ground, which had also been the home ground of the previous club.

Initially placed in the Isthmian League Third Division, Aldershot Town won the league in their debut 1992–93 season and won promotion out of the Second Division the following season. They won the First Division title in 1997–98 and the Premier Division in 2002–03 to gain a place in the Conference. They spent five seasons in the Conference, losing twice in the play-offs, before winning promotion into the Football League as Conference National and Conference League Cup champions under Gary Waddock's stewardship in 2007–08. They spent five seasons in League Two, reaching the play-offs in 2010, though were relegated back into non-league football and entered administration in May 2013. They reached the National League play-offs in 2017 and 2018.

History

Formation and the Isthmian years
In March 1992, the town of Aldershot was without a football club after Aldershot F.C. became the first Football League team to fold during the football season since Accrington Stanley in 1962. The original Aldershot club had been in the Football League since 1932 and competed in the Third and Fourth Divisions. Promotion had been achieved as recently as 1987, but relegation followed two years later and debts well into six figures had almost brought about the club’s demise in the summer of 1990. Despite a rescue package allowing the original winding-up order to be rescinded, the club’s debts remained high and the club finally went bust just over 18 months later.

Aldershot Town was born later the same year, and began life competing in the Isthmian League Division Three. Despite Aldershot Town playing five divisions lower than the Football League, the attendance for their first competitive fixture was higher than the old team's last home tie, with attendances that season averaging around 2,000 at a level where attendances normally averaged around 100.

Ten successive victories were recorded under the guidance of former player Steve Wignall and Aldershot won the championship by an 18-point margin.

A further promotion and an FA Vase quarter-final placing was achieved in the 1993–94 season. When Steve Wignall departed to take charge of Colchester United midway through the 1994–95 season, former Nottingham Forest winger Steve Wigley took over. The club finished the 1994–95 season with a run of six successive victories, but missed out on promotion by goal difference. After narrowly missing out during the next two seasons Wigley left in July 1997 to become Youth Development Officer at Nottingham Forest. He was replaced by George Borg, another former Aldershot FC player.

Attendances continued to rise during this period and the final fixture of the 1997–98 Isthmian League First Division championship-winning season, at home to Berkhamsted Town, attracted 4,289 fans to the Recreation Ground – a league record and an attendance comparable to that of many fourth and even third tier clubs at the time.

The success under Borg continued with an Isthmian League Cup, two Hampshire Senior Cups and a runners-up spot in the Isthmian League Premier Division.

The club's reserves were reinstated in 2000–01 and entered the Suburban League. The FA Cup in 2000–01 saw Aldershot take on league opposition at The Recreation Ground for the first time since reforming, when Brighton & Hove Albion visited for a 1st Round tie in November and a record attendance of 7,500 saw the league team win. In the following season's FA Cup the Shots held Bristol Rovers to a home draw in the First Round, but again missed out on the Second Round after losing the replay in Bristol.

George Borg resigned as manager in November 2001 after pressure from supporters and was replaced by Terry Brown. He won his first game in charge beating Newport IOW 1–0 in the Hampshire Senior Cup Semi-final Second Leg, taking The Shots on to win the final against Havant & Waterlooville. In Brown's first full season in charge he overhauled the squad, and by mid-November the Shots were top of the table, a position they did not relinquish for the remainder of the season, winning promotion to the Football Conference. After just 11 years, four promotions had now been achieved and just one more promotion was required for league football to return to Aldershot.

The club also retained the Hampshire Senior Cup with a 2–1 win over Bashley.

Conference years

A crowd of 3,680 saw Aldershot's first game in the Conference, a 2–1 win over Accrington Stanley. The club went on to stay in the play-off positions in the league table for all but 3 days of the season. The Shots equalled their best ever run in the FA Cup, reaching the 2nd Round and losing 1–0 to Colchester United at Layer Road. The club reached their first FA Trophy semi-final, losing to eventual winners Hednesford Town and the average attendance for league matches at The Rec ended on a record high of 3,303.

A 1–1 draw against Tamworth on the last day of the season carried the Shots into the play-offs for a place in the Football League. Over two legs the Shots held their own against favourites Hereford United, drawing 1–1 at The Rec and 0–0 at Edgar Street. Extra time finished without any further score and the tie was concluded on penalties with the Shots winning 4–2. The 2004 Conference play-off Final against Shrewsbury Town finished 1–1 after extra time. Shrewsbury returned to the league with a 3–0 win in the penalty shoot-out.

In May 2004 the club officers made the decision to convert Aldershot Town to full-time professional status from the following July. In 2004–05 the Shots once again equalled their best ever run in the FA Cup as they reached the 2nd Round proper, where they lost 5–1 to Hartlepool United. After a slow start in the league, Aldershot improved their form and reached the play-offs after beating Scarborough in the last game of the season. The Shots won the first leg against Carlisle United 1–0 at home, but lost the away leg 2–1, giving a 2–2 aggregate score. Extra time could not separate the sides and the tie went to penalties, with Carlisle winning the shootout.

The next two seasons were less successful for the Shots. 2005–06 saw Aldershot's team suffer numerous injuries, and they struggled to 13th in the table. The team made it to the 2nd round of the FA Cup, losing 1–0 at home to Scunthorpe United. The next season was equally disappointing, with the side never really getting close enough to the aim of finishing in the playoff positions. The club eventually made it to 9th in the reformed 24 club Conference Premier, finishing 13 points off the playoffs. Terry Brown resigned, citing the poor health of his wife as the primary reason, although his position may have been untenable with regards to the season's performance. Martin Kuhl took over as caretaker manager. They made it to the Third round of the FA Cup for the first time, losing 4–2 at Bloomfield Road to Blackpool

Promotion to the Football League
In May 2007 Gary Waddock was appointed the new manager, with Martin Kuhl reverting to his coaching position. The Shots started the season strongly, losing few games before the turn of the year. Jonny Dixon was sold to Brighton and Hove Albion in the January Transfer window for a then club record of £56,000. The Shots finished top of the Conference Premier with a record 101 points, and were promoted to the Football League, for the first time since the club was reformed ending the season on an 18-match undefeated run.

The Shots also made it to the Conference League Cup Final after a 4–3 penalty shoot out victory over near neighbours Woking in the semi-final. The final, played at the Recreation Ground on 3 April, was against Rushden & Diamonds. With the scores 1–1 at full-time, then 3–3 after extra time, Aldershot won 4–3 on penalties.

Football League
Sixteen years after the demise of Aldershot F.C., the town of Aldershot had a Football League team again. The club retained much of the 2007–08 promotion winning team, and added several signings, both permanent and on loan. Gary Waddock and Martin Kuhl also committed their futures to the club by signing new three-year contracts. Joel Grant was sold to Crewe Alexandra for £130,000, a club record. On the opening day of the 2008–09 season, Aldershot Town won their first league game on their return to the Football League at Accrington Stanley 1–0. This was followed four days later by the club's first ever EFL Cup game, against Coventry City at the Ricoh Arena, which the Shots lost 3–1. The Shots finished fifteenth in League Two in their first season in the Football League.

Two months into the 2009–10 season, manager Gary Waddock and assistant Martin Kuhl accepted offers to join Wycombe Wanderers. Jason Dodd was appointed as Caretaker Manager, assisted by Paul Williams before Kevin Dillon, the former first-team coach of Reading, was appointed as Waddock's permanent successor in November 2009. Two days later Dillon appointed Gary Owers as his assistant manager. Under the new management team Aldershot finished the season in sixth place, qualifying them for the play-offs, where they lost 3–0 on aggregate to Rotherham United.

In January 2011 Kevin Dillon and assistant Gary Owers had left the club by mutual agreement, with the club lying 20th in League Two, after winning just 6 out of 22 league games. Dillon was replaced by Newport County manager Dean Holdsworth. Holdsworth succeeded in removing the threat of relegation, eventually guiding the club to 14th position in a run which included only 4 defeats in the second half of the season.
Aldershot finished 11th in the 2011–12. A good run in the League Cup saw Aldershot take on Manchester United at home, which ended in a 3–0 victory for the Red Devils. Holdsworth was sacked by Aldershot on 20 February 2013 with the team in 20th place in League Two.

Administration and return to Conference

In the summer 2012, a major shareholder suffered a major stroke, debilitating him and creating a financial insecurity that would prove dangerous come the following year. In May 2013, Aldershot Town announced that they were in financial difficulties, with players' wages going unpaid. The Chief Executive, Andrew Mills, announced his resignation saying that there was no evidence that the major shareholder Kris Machala had the ability to fund the club. Director Tony Knights admitted that the club has been "haemorrhaging money". On 2 May 2013, just five days after their relegation from the Football League, Aldershot Town officially entered administration. The club fell with debts of over £1 million.

On 1 August 2013, Aldershot Town confirmed the takeover of the club by a consortium led by former chairman Shahid Azeem. In conjunction, the club announced the agreement of a lucrative deal with Chelsea to host a significant number of matches played by the Chelsea Academy and Reserves over the next two years.

Aldershot were relegated from the National League in 2019 after finishing 21st. However, they were reprieved from relegation after Gateshead were administratively relegated. 
 The 2019–20 National League was suspended in March 2020 due to the COVID-19 pandemic with the Shots finishing in 18th place based on points per game. Aldershot Town finished 15th in the 2020–21 season finishing with 52 points.

Stadium

Aldershot Town play their home games at The Recreation Ground, which has a capacity of 7,100. The stadium was previously the home of Aldershot F.C. The stadium's current sponsor is EBB Paper, therefore the ground is advertly known as The EBB Stadium at The Recreation Ground, however is affectionately known as 'The Rec'.

In March 2018, Aldershot Town presented proposals for the redevelopment of the EBB Stadium to Rushmoor Borough Council which would see the potential development of a new stadium, containing both seating and standing areas, that will give the club a 'long-term home from which to build our ambitions on the pitch'.

Players

Current squad

Out on loan

Notable players
For all Aldershot Town F.C. players with a Wikipedia article see :Category:Aldershot Town F.C. players.

Players of the season

Managers

(c) = Caretaker managers
Updated 2nd March 2023

Honours

League
Conference Premier (Tier 5)
Champions: 2007–08
Play-off runners-up: 2003–04

Isthmian League Premier (Tier 6)
Winners: 2002–03

Isthmian League Division One (Tier 7)
Winners: 1997–98

Isthmian League Division Three
Winners: 1992–93

Cups
Conference League Cup
Winners: 2007–08

Hampshire Senior Cup
Winners (5): 1998–99, 1999–2000, 2001–02, 2002–03, 2006–07

Records

Appearances and goals

Jason Chewins holds the record for the most number of appearances for the club, playing 489 times between August 1994 and May 2004. This led to the left-back being the first and, to date, only player to receive a testimonial match, which was played against Portsmouth in July 2004.

Before Chewins, the record was held by Mark Butler, who joined the club at its inception in 1992. Butler played 303 times between August 1992 and May 1998, also holding the all-time goal scoring record by netting 155 times, a record he still currently holds. Former goalkeeper Nikki Bull made his 300th appearance for the Shots in November 2008 and eventually made 313 appearances before moving to Brentford in July 2009. Five others have played more than 200 times for the club, including Stuart Udal, whose cousin Shaun was an England international cricketer. Winger Jimmy Sugrue has also reached the landmark. More recently, three members of the 2007–08 title winning squad, namely Anthony Charles, Anthony Straker and Danny Hylton reached the landmark.

Gary Abbott is, apart from Butler, the only Shots player to have ever scored over 100 goals for the club. Over the course of three seasons, between August 1998 and May 2001, he scored 120 goals.

Most appearances

As of 6 May 2017

Most goals

Up to and including, Hereford United (h), 26 April 2014.

Transfers
Record Purchase
Marvin Morgan from Woking for an undisclosed fee (but a club record) in May 2008. The previous highest fee paid for a player was the £20,000 paid to Woking for Grant Payne in November 1999.
Record Sale
Joel Grant to Crewe Alexandra for £130,000 in June 2008.
 Note that Idris Kanu was sold to Peterborough United for an undisclosed but potentially club record fee in August 2017.
 Also note that Bernard Mensah was sold to Bristol Rovers for an undisclosed but potentially club record fee in January 2018. This deal was rumoured to be in the range of £100,000 and £150,000.

Best performances
FA Cup
Fourth Round, 2012–13
EFL Cup
Fourth round, 2011–12
EFL Trophy
Second round, 2009–10 & 2010–11
FA Trophy
Semi-finalists, 2003–04 & 2007–08
Conference League Cup
Winners, 2007–08
FA Vase
Quarter-finalists, 1993–94
Isthmian League Cup
Winners, 1998–99
Hampshire Senior Cup
Winners, 1998–99, 1999–00, 2001–02, 2002–03 & 2006–07

Seasons
Statistics for the previous decade. For a full history see; List of Aldershot Town F.C. seasons

Kits
Aldershot Town's home kit is red with blue and white trim. The club have always played in a predominantly red kit with blue features, including stripes and quarters. The club's chosen colours of red and blue reflect the garrison town's association with the British Army.

Kit supplier
Errea were the kit supplier for the 2011–12 season. Adidas has been the kit supplier from the 2013–14 season.

Kit manufacturers and sponsors

Previous kits

Further details and images of previous kits can be found at the Historical Football Kit website.

Rivalries 
Aldershot Town's local rivals are Rushmoor neighbours Farnborough and Surrey side Woking.  Fixtures against these sides attract larger than average crowds, including 5,961 for a Hampshire Senior Cup Semi Final, a league record 5,518 in an Isthmian League Premier Division match against Farnborough and 6,870 for an FA Cup 1st round match against Woking.

The original Aldershot were rivals with Reading until their demise in 1992 but are still considered the main rival of the club by supporters. The only meeting between the two clubs since the rebirth of Aldershot was a friendly in 2001 which resulted in an outbreak of violence between the two sets of fans and multiple arrests. Other teams which may be considered smaller rivals include Maidenhead United and Eastleigh.

Aldershot also has a friendly relationship & close ties with “sister club” Badshot Lea. The two annually hold pre-season fixtures against each other. On 6th July 2019, the two played in the inaugural match of Badshot Lea’s new stadium Westfield Lane, seen by 660 spectators, a record attendance for The Baggies still held today.

Notes

References

External links 

 Official website

 
Football clubs in Hampshire
Association football clubs established in 1992
1992 establishments in England
Isthmian League
National League (English football) clubs
Former English Football League clubs
Football clubs in England
Sport in Aldershot
Phoenix clubs (association football)
Companies that have entered administration in the United Kingdom